Two Girls on Broadway is a 1940 musical film directed by S. Sylvan Simon and starring Lana Turner and Joan Blondell. The film is a remake of The Broadway Melody (1929).

Plot
Molly Mahoney (Joan Blondell) forms a vaudeville act with her fiancé Eddie Kerns (George Murphy). Working at a local dance school, she longs to become a star performing on Broadway. Eddie persuades her to leave town for New York City, and after their arrival, Eddie debuts on the radio with his so-called singing canaries. Although the canaries are unable to sing, Eddie is not, and following an impressive debut he is offered a job at the station. He convinces co-worker Buddy Bartell (Richard Lanez) to grant Molly and her little sister Pat (Lana Turner) an audition.

What promised to be a big opportunity turns into the start of noticeable tensions between the sisters, when Bartell announces he wants to team Eddie and Pat. Molly, meanwhile, is offered a degrading job selling cigarettes. Instead of complaining, Molly swallows her pride and allows Pat to take the limelight meant for her. Meanwhile, wealthy and often-married playboy 'Chat' Chatsworth (Kent Taylor) falls for Pat and starts flirting with her. After a while, Molly finds out about Chat's wild past through her gossipy friend Jed Marlowe (Wallace Ford), and tries to warn her sister.

Her worries turn out to be unnecessary, though, as Pat feels more attracted to Eddie. She does not want to hurt Molly's feeling or ruin her engagement, and decides to return home. Molly, who is unaware of Pat's motives for leaving, insists that she stay. Thinking it is the only way of forgetting her feelings for Eddie, Pat accepts a proposal from Chat and elopes with him. When Eddie hears about this, he is alarmed, because he had been secretly in love with Pat the entire time. He admits his true feeling for Pat to Molly, and is encouraged to follow her. However, upon arriving at the apartment, Eddie finds out that Pat and Chat have already left.

Overhearing one of Chat's servants of Pat and Chat's whereabouts, Eddie rushes to City Hall. Breaking up a wedding ceremony that has already begun, Eddie professes his love for Pat. With the blessing of Molly, Pat and Eddie decide to marry, while Molly returns home.

Cast
 Lana Turner as Patricia 'Pat' Mahoney
 Joan Blondell as Molly Mahoney
 George Murphy as Eddie Kerns
 Kent Taylor as 'Chat' Chatsworth
 Richard Lane as Buddy Bartell
 Wallace Ford as Jed Marlowe
 Otto Hahn as Ito, Chatworth's servant
 Lloyd Corrigan as Judge Hennessey
 Don Wilson as Mr. Boyle, Radio Announcer
 Charles Wagenheim as Harry, Bartell's Assistant
 May McAvoy - uncredited

Production
The film was Joan Blondell's first film for MGM. By the time of production, Lana Turner was hailed 'The Girl They're All Talking About! Lovely Lana, America's Blonde Bonfire, in her hottest, most daring role!' Being in the middle of a highly publicized career, Turner was in the position to demand top billing, even though she was less experienced than her co-stars.

Reception
The film received mixed reviews, with most critics complaining about the plot taking a second place to showcasing Turner. A New York Times critic wrote: "With Lana Turner figuring prominently in the doings, it is fairly safe to predict that none of the patrons will bother to inquire where and when they have seen Two Girls on Broadway before. There is an indefinable something about Miss Turner that makes it a matter of small concern."

On the other hand, Turner was praised for her musical talents, one reviewer describing her dance abilities as "precision and grace". A critic for The Hollywood Reporter even wrote that she should be teamed with Fred Astaire.

Box office
According to MGM records the film earned $475,000 in the US and Canada and $198,000 elsewhere resulting in a profit of $12,000.

References

External links
 
 
 
 

1940 films
1940 musical films
American black-and-white films
1940s English-language films
Films directed by S. Sylvan Simon
Films scored by David Raksin
Metro-Goldwyn-Mayer films
American musical films
1940s American films